Robert Marvin Hull  (January 3, 1939 – January 30, 2023) was a Canadian professional ice hockey player who is widely regarded as one of the greatest players of all time. His blonde hair, skating speed, end-to-end rushes, and ability to shoot the puck at very high velocity all earned him the name "The Golden Jet". His talents were such that an opposing player was often assigned just to shadow him.

During his 23 year playing career, from 1957 to 1980, he played in both the National Hockey League (NHL) and World Hockey Association (WHA) with the Chicago Black Hawks, Winnipeg Jets, and Hartford Whalers. He won the Hart Memorial Trophy as the NHL's most valuable player twice and the Art Ross Trophy as the NHL's leading point scorer three times, while helping the Black Hawks win the Stanley Cup in 1961. He also led the WHA's Winnipeg Jets to Avco Cup championships in 1976 and 1978. He led the NHL in goals seven times, the second most of any player in history, and led the WHA in goals one additional time while being the WHA's most valuable player two times. He was elected to the Hockey Hall of Fame in 1983, the Ontario Sports Hall of Fame in 1997, and received the Wayne Gretzky International Award in 2003. In 2017 Hull was named one of the '100 Greatest NHL Players' in history.

Off the ice, Hull was noted for domestic violence allegations and allegedly making comments supporting Adolf Hitler.

Early life
Hull was born in Point Anne, Ontario on January 3, 1939. He was the son of Lena Cook and Robert Edward Hull, a cement company foreman. He played his minor hockey in nearby Belleville, and then Junior B hockey for the Woodstock Warriors in the fall of 1954. Hull led the Warriors to the 1955 Sutherland Cup as Ontario champions. Later, he played for the Galt Black Hawks and the St. Catharines Teepees in the Ontario Hockey Association, before joining the Chicago Black Hawks in 1957 at the age of 18.

Playing career

NHL career

Hull had a solid debut year, finishing second in voting for the Calder Memorial Trophy. Hull originally wore numbers 16 and 7 as a Black Hawk but later switched to his famous number 9, a tribute to his childhood idol Gordie Howe. By his third season (1959–60), he led the league in goal- and point-scoring (the Art Ross Trophy), a double feat which he also achieved in 1961–62 and 1965–66. He led Chicago to the Stanley Cup in 1961—their third overall and first in 23 years. He finished second in point-scoring three further times.

On March 12, 1966, Hull became the first NHL player to score more than 50 goals in a season, surpassing Maurice Richard's, Bernie Geoffrion's, and his own mark of 50 goals. His 51st goal, scored on Cesare Maniago of the New York Rangers, earned him a seven-minute standing ovation from the Chicago Stadium faithful. Hull eventually scored 54 goals that season, the highest single-season total of the Original Six era. That same year, Hull set the record for the most points in a season with 97, one more than the previous record set by Dickie Moore 7 years earlier. His point total was tied the next year by teammate Stan Mikita and their record was broken three years later by Phil Esposito. Hull led the league in goal-scoring seven times during the 1960s. In 1968–69, despite Hull breaking his own goals in a season record by four goals (netting 58) and setting a career NHL high of 107 points (second in the league that year), the Hawks missed the playoffs for the first time since his rookie season. By his final NHL season, he had scored 50 goals or more a remarkable five times. This was only one time less than all other players in NHL history combined up until that point in time.

In his 15 full NHL seasons he was voted the First-Team All-Star left winger ten times and the Second-Team All-Star left winger twice. His slapshot was once clocked at 118.3 mph (190.5 km/h) and he could skate 29.7 mph (47.8 km/h). During his drive to be the first to eclipse the 50 goal mark, Hull's wrist shot was said to be harder than his slapshot.

WHA career
Long unhappy with his poor salary despite being one of hockey's preeminent superstars, Hull responded to overtures from the upstart World Hockey Association's Winnipeg Jets in 1972 by jesting that he would jump to them for a million dollars, a sum then considered absurd. Gathering the other league owners together to contribute to the unprecedented amount on the grounds that inking such a major star gave instant credibility to the new rival league that was competing directly against the entrenched NHL, Jets owner Ben Hatskin agreed to the sum, and signed Hull as a player/coach for a contract worth $1.75 million over 10 years plus a $1 million signing bonus. Although his debut with Winnipeg was held up in litigation by the NHL, Hull instantly became the WHA's greatest star winning the Gordie Howe Trophy as league MVP in 1972–73 and 1974–75. With Swedish linemates Anders Hedberg and Ulf Nilsson he formed one of the most formidable forward lines of the 1970s (known as "The Hot Line"), leading the Jets to two AVCO Cups during his time with the club. His best performance was during the 1974–75 season, when he scored 77 goals to set a new professional mark, while adding 65 assists for a total of 142 points, five behind the league leader, one of two times he finished second in the point-scoring race in the WHA. In the five WHA seasons in which he played more than half the schedule, he was voted a First-Team All-Star thrice and a Second-Team All-Star twice, while tallying 50 goals and 100 points four times each.

Because he joined the rival league, Hull was not allowed to represent Team Canada in the 1972 Summit Series, which pitted Canada's top NHL players against the USSR's national team. Two years later, a second Summit Series was held in which Hull and other top WHA stars (including Gordie Howe, who had been retired from the NHL at the time of the initial Summit Series) competed against the Soviet national team. The WHA lost the series four games to one (three ending in a tie), despite Hull's seven goals. He was a key member of the Canadian squad that won the 1976 Canada Cup, though, scoring five goals and three assists in seven games.

Bobby Hull rule
Hull and teammate Stan Mikita were catalysts for a 1960s craze where players curved the blades of their hockey sticks, which became widely referred to as "banana blades". Hull is the player typically linked most to the rule that banned this practice because of the potential danger to goalies, few of whom wore masks in that era. The curved blade made the puck's trajectory unpredictable.

Later career and retirements
Slowed by injuries and age, Hull played only a few games in the WHA's final season of 1978–79. However, after the 1979 merger of the two leagues (including the Jets) and reportedly in financial straits, Hull came out of retirement to play once more for the NHL Jets. He played in eighteen games before being traded to the Hartford Whalers for future considerations, bringing the two-time Gordie Howe Trophy winner together with the 51-year-old Howe himself (who, after Hull's initial contest with the Whalers, told the press, "The kid looks good in his first game."). Hull played effectively in nine games (two goals and five assists) and three playoff games before retiring once more to care for his partner, who had been injured in an automobile accident.

In September 1981, Hull attempted one final comeback with the New York Rangers at age 42, at the suggestion of Rangers coach Herb Brooks, who wanted to try reuniting Hull with his former Jets teammates, Hedberg and Nilsson. The comeback attempt lasted five exhibition games, during which Hull had one goal and one assist, before he and the Rangers both decided it was best to end the comeback. It was the second time in Hull's career that he had played exhibition games with the Rangers; in 1959, after missing the playoffs the previous spring, the Rangers and the Boston Bruins had been sent on an exhibition tour of Europe, and then-emerging star Hull and Eddie Shack were added to the Rangers' roster for the tour. Hull and Shack co-led the Rangers in scoring, each netting 14 goals over the 23-game tour.

Hull ended his career having played in 1,063 NHL games, accumulating 610 goals, 560 assists, 1,170 points, 640 penalty minutes, three Art Ross Trophies, two Hart Memorial Trophies (he finished second or third in the voting an additional six times), a Lady Byng Memorial Trophy, and a Stanley Cup Championship, adding 62 goals and 67 assists for 129 points in 119 playoff games. He played in 411 WHA games, scoring 303 goals, 335 assists, and 638 points, adding 43 goals and 37 assists in 60 playoff games. His North American major league professional total of 1,018 goals (NHL and WHA including playoffs) is the third most of all-time after Wayne Gretzky (1,109) and Gordie Howe (1,071), although the NHL does not recognize scoring statistics from the WHA in players' career totals.

Post-playing career
In 1978, he was made an Officer of the Order of Canada. Besides his Hall of Fame induction, Hull's no. 9 jersey has been retired by the Black Hawks, the Jets, and their successor team, the Arizona Coyotes. When Bobby's son Brett Hull joined the Coyotes, they unretired the number for Brett to wear during his brief stint there to honour his father. Evander Kane, who wore number 9 for the current Winnipeg Jets franchise, sought and received Hull's permission to wear the number.

In 2003, he was named the figurehead commissioner of a new World Hockey Association, intended to operate during the 2004–05 NHL lockout; it never entered play, and the organization subsequently ran several ephemeral low-minor league and unsanctioned Tier II junior leagues. Hull served as an ambassador for the Blackhawks through part of the 2021–22 season until the organization announced, "When it comes to Bobby, specifically, we jointly agreed earlier this season that he will retire from any official team role."

Personal life and death

Hull's younger brother Dennis (nicknamed "the Silver Jet") starred alongside him with the Chicago Black Hawks for eight seasons, scoring over 300 goals in his own right. Some commentators often wondered which brother had the harder shot. When Bobby was excluded from the 1972 Summit Series because he had signed to play in the WHA, Dennis initially planned to boycott the event as well as a show of support for his brother, but Bobby persuaded him to stay on Team Canada.

Hull's marriage to Joanne McKay ended in divorce in 1980 after several abusive incidents.

In 1986, he was arrested and charged with assault and battery after allegedly hitting his third wife, Deborah, after an argument. She eventually dropped the charges.

Hull was romantically involved with a woman named Claudia Allen. In 1980, Hull retired from the Hartford Whalers to take care of Allen, who was injured in a severe automobile accident. The couple never married.

In 1998, Hull allegedly made pro-Nazi comments to The Moscow Times. He was quoted as saying, "Hitler, for example, had some good ideas. He just went a little bit too far." Hull later denied having complimented Hitler and said journalists had raised the subject. The incident was parodied on the Canadian news satire show This Hour Has 22 Minutes, with Rick Mercer reading a spot saying Hull had been misquoted, and had actually said, "Sittler had some good ideas."

Children
Brett Hull (the "Golden Brett"), was also a hockey star, finishing his NHL career with 741 goals (currently the fifth-highest goal total in NHL history). Bobby and Brett are the only father-and-son tandem to achieve the marks of more than 50 goals in a NHL season and more than 600 NHL goals. They are also the only father-and-son tandem to win the Hart Memorial Trophy (Bobby twice and Brett once) and Lady Byng Trophy, and to lead the league in goal scoring (Bobby seven times and Brett three times). While playing for the Phoenix Coyotes in 2005, Brett donned his father's retired No. 9 for the last five games of his career.

Bart Hull was a standout running back for the Boise State University' Broncos football team and played with the Ottawa Rough Riders and Saskatchewan Roughriders in the Canadian Football League (CFL) as well as one season of professional indoor football prior to recurring injuries. Post football, he briefly played professional hockey with the Idaho Steelheads.

Bobby Jr. and Blake both played junior and senior hockey. Bobby Jr. won the Memorial Cup with the 1980 Cornwall Royals. Later, the brothers played together for the Allan Cup-winning Brantford Mott's Clamatos of the OHA Senior A Hockey League (AAA Men's Amateur) in 1987.

Hull's daughter, Michelle, was an accomplished figure skater, becoming British Columbia Pre-Novice Champion at the age of 11. After many knee injuries, she ended her figure skating career and is now an attorney licensed in two states. She works with battered women as a result of witnessing her father's treatment of her mother, Joanne McKay.

Bobby Hull Community Rink

The Town of Cicero, Illinois created a public outdoor rink in his name. The rink hosts skating lessons, public skate, public Stick & Puck, High School Hockey games, and more.

Death
On January 30, 2023, Hull died at his home in Wheaton, Illinois, at the age of 84. His son Brett released a statement following his father's death via the Twitter account of the St. Louis Blues.

Awards and achievements
 Art Ross Trophy winner (1960, 1962, and 1966)
 NHL First All-Star Team left wing (1960, 1962, 1964, 1965, 1966, 1967, 1968, 1969, 1970, and 1972)
 Stanley Cup champion (1961)
 NHL Second All-Star Team left wing (1963 and 1971)
 Hart Memorial Trophy winner (1965 and 1966)
 Lady Byng Memorial Trophy winner (1965)
 Lester Patrick Trophy winner (1969)
 Became third hockey player to appear on the cover of Time magazine
 NHL All-Star game MVP (1970, 1971), only player to win consecutive All-Star game MVP awards
 WHA First All-Star Team (1973, 1974, and 1975)
 WHA Second All-Star Team (1976 and 1978)
 WHA Most Valuable Player (1973 and 1975)
 Avco Cup (WHA) champion (1976, 1978, and 1979)
 Inducted into the Hockey Hall of Fame in 1983
 When he moved to the WHA, he was the second leading goal-scorer and ninth leading point-scorer in NHL history.
 Second in WHA history in goals, sixth in assists and third in points
 In 1998, he was ranked number 8 on The Hockey News list of the 100 Greatest Hockey Players, the highest-ranking left winger
 Honoured member of the Manitoba Hockey Hall of Fame
 Member of the Manitoba Sports Hall of Fame
 Inaugural member of the World Hockey Association Hall of Fame.
 Honoured member of the Ontario Sports Hall of Fame
 In 2011, statues of Hull and Stan Mikita were installed outside the United Center, where the Blackhawks currently play

Career statistics

Regular season and playoffs

Head coaching record

See also
 List of members of the Hockey Hall of Fame
 List of NHL statistical leaders
 List of family relations in the NHL
 List of professional sports families
 List of NHL players with 1,000 points
 List of NHL players with 500 goals
 List of NHL players with 1,000 games played
 List of Canadian sports personalities

References

External links

 
 Bobby Hull's biography at Canadian Sports Hall of Fame
 Bobby Hull's biography at Manitoba Hockey Hall of Fame
 Career Overview and Biography by ESPN
 Bobby Hull, winner of the Lionel Conacher Award and the Bobbie Rosenfeld Award: Virtual Museum of Canada Exhibit
 

1939 births
2023 deaths
Art Ross Trophy winners
Canadian ice hockey coaches
Canadian ice hockey left wingers
Chicago Blackhawks players
Galt Black Hawks players
Hart Memorial Trophy winners
Hartford Whalers players
Hockey Hall of Fame inductees
Ice hockey people from Ontario
Ice hockey player-coaches
Lady Byng Memorial Trophy winners
Lester Patrick Trophy recipients
Manitoba Sports Hall of Fame inductees
National Hockey League All-Stars
National Hockey League players with retired numbers
Officers of the Order of Canada
People from Addison, Illinois
People from Pointe Anne, Ontario
Sportspeople from Belleville, Ontario
St. Catharines Teepees players
Stanley Cup champions
Winnipeg Jets (1972–1996) coaches
Winnipeg Jets (1979–1996) players
Winnipeg Jets (WHA) players
World Hockey Association broadcasters